Fattu Chak  is a village in Kapurthala district of Punjab State, India. The village is administrated by a Sarpanch, who is an elected representative.

Demography 
According to the report published by Census India in 2011, Fattu Chak has a total number of 171 houses and population of 783 of which include 407 males and 376 females. Literacy rate of Fattu Chak is 74.44%, lower than state average of 75.84%.  The population of children under the age of 6 years is 71 which is  9.07% of total population of Fattu Chak, and child sex ratio is approximately  821, lower than state average of 846.

As per census 2011, 248 people were engaged in work activities out of the total population of Fattu Chak which includes 219 males and 29 females. According to census survey report 2011, 96.37% workers describe their work as main work and 3.63% workers are involved in Marginal activity providing livelihood for less than 6 months.

Caste  
The village has schedule caste (SC) constitutes 53.51% of total population of the village and it doesn't have any Schedule Tribe (ST) population.

Population data

See also 
List of villages in Kapurthala

External links
  Villages in Kapurthala
 Kapurthala Villages List

References

Villages in Kapurthala district